Multipole radiation is a theoretical framework for the description of electromagnetic or gravitational radiation from time-dependent distributions of distant sources. These tools are applied to physical phenomena which occur at a variety of length scales - from gravitational waves due to galaxy collisions to gamma radiation resulting from nuclear decay. Multipole radiation is analyzed using similar multipole expansion techniques that describe fields from static sources, however there are important differences in the details of the analysis because multipole radiation fields behave quite differently from static fields. This article is primarily concerned with electromagnetic multipole radiation, although the treatment of gravitational waves is similar.

Electromagnetic radiation depends on structural details of the source system of electric charge and electric current. Direct analysis can be intractable if the structure is unknown or complicated. Multipole analysis offers a way to separate the radiation into moments of increasing complexity. Since the electromagnetic field depends more heavily on lower-order moments than on higher-order moments, the electromagnetic field can be approximated without knowing the structure in detail.

Properties of multipole radiation

Linearity of moments
Since Maxwell's equations are linear, the electric field and magnetic field depend linearly on source distributions. Linearity allows the fields from various multipole moments to be calculated independently and added together to give the total field of the system. This is the well-known principle of superposition.

Origin dependence of multipole moments
Multipole moments are calculated with respect to a fixed expansion point which is taken to be the origin of a given coordinate system. Translating the origin changes the multipole moments of the system with the exception of the first non-vanishing moment. For example, the monopole moment of charge is simply the total charge in the system. Changing the origin will never change this moment. If the monopole moment is zero then the dipole moment of the system will be translation invariant. If both the monopole and dipole moments are zero then the quadrupole moment is translation invariant, and so forth. Because higher-order moments depend on the position of the origin, they cannot be regarded as invariant properties of the system.

Field dependence on distance
The field from a multipole moment depends on both the distance from the origin and the angular orientation of the evaluation point with respect to the coordinate system. That is, the electric field from the electric monopole moment scales as inverse distance squared. Likewise, the electric dipole moment creates a field that scales as inverse distance cubed, and so on. As distance increases, the contribution of high-order moments becomes much smaller than the contribution from low-order moments, so high-order moments can be ignored to simplify calculations.

The radial dependence of radiation waves is different from static fields because these waves carry energy away from the system. As a spherical wave expands, the fixed energy of the wave must spread out over an expanding sphere of surface area . Hence, high-order moments cannot be discarded as easily as in static case.

Time-dependent electromagnetic fields

Sources
Time-dependent source distributions can be expressed using Fourier analysis. This allows separate frequencies to be analyzed independently. Charge density is given by

and current density by

For convenience, only a single angular frequency ω is considered from this point forward; thus

The superposition principle may be applied to generalize results for multiple frequencies. Vector quantities appear in bold. The standard convention of taking the real part of complex quantities to represent physical quantities is used.

The intrinsic angular momentum of elementary particles (see Spin (physics)) may also affect electromagnetic radiation from some source materials. To account for these effects, the intrinsic magnetization of the system  would have to be taken into account. For simplicity however, these effects will be deferred to the discussion of generalized multipole radiation.

Potentials
The source distributions can be integrated to yield the time-dependent electric potential and magnetic potential φ and A respectively. Formulas are expressed in the Lorenz Gauge in SI units.

Integrating the time-dependent source distributions above yields

where . These formulas provide the basis for analyzing multipole radiation.

Multipole expansion in near field
The near field is the region around a source where the electromagnetic field can be evaluated quasi-statically. If target distance from the multipole origin  is much smaller than the radiation wavelength , then . As a result, the exponential can be approximated in this region as:

See Taylor expansion. By using this approximation, the remaining  dependence is the same as it is for a static system, the same analysis applies. Essentially, the potentials can be evaluated in the near field at a given instant by simply taking a snapshot of the system and treating it as though it were static - hence it is called quasi-static. See near and far field and multipole expansion. In particular, the inverse distance  is expanded using spherical harmonics which are integrated separately to obtain spherical multipole coefficients.

Multipole expansion in far field: Multipole radiation
At large distances from a high frequency source, the following approximations hold:

Each power of  corresponds to a different multipole moment. The first few moments are evaluated directly below.

Electric monopole radiation, nonexistence
The zeroth order term, applied to the scalar potential gives

where the total charge  is the electric monopole moment oscillating at frequency . Conservation of charge requires  since

If the system is closed then the total charge cannot fluctuate which means the oscillation amplitude q must be zero. Hence, . The corresponding fields and radiant power must also be zero.

Electric dipole radiation

Electric dipole potential
Electric dipole radiation can be derived by applying the zeroth-order term to the vector potential.

Integration by parts yields

and the charge continuity equation shows

It follows that

Similar results can be obtained by applying the first-order term,  to the scalar potential.

Electric dipole fields
Once the time-dependent potentials are understood, the time-dependent electric field and magnetic field can be calculated in the usual way. Namely,

or, in a source-free region of space, the relationship between the magnetic field and the electric field can be used to obtain

where  is the impedance of free space. The electric and magnetic fields that correspond to the potentials above are

which is consistent with spherical radiation waves.

Pure electric dipole power
The power density, energy per unit area per unit time, is expressed by the Poynting vector . It follows that the time averaged power density per unit solid angle is given by

The dot product with  extracts the emission magnitude and the factor of 1/2 comes from averaging over time. As explained above, the  cancels the radial dependence of radiation energy density. Application to a pure electric dipole gives

Integration over a sphere yields the total power radiated:

Magnetic dipole radiation

Magnetic dipole potential
The first-order term, applied to the vector potential gives magnetic dipole radiation and electric quadrupole radiation.

The integrand can be separated into symmetric and anti-symmetric parts in J and x′

The second term contains the effective magnetization due to the current  and integration gives the magnetic dipole moment.

That means the magnetic field from a magnetic dipole behaves similarly to the electric field from an electric dipole. Likewise, the electric field from a magnetic dipole behaves like the magnetic field from an electric dipole. Taking the transformations

on previous results yields magnetic dipole results.

Magnetic dipole fields

Pure magnetic dipole power
The average power radiated per unit solid angle by a magnetic dipole is

where θ is measured with respect to the magnetic dipole . The total power radiated is:

Electric quadrupole radiation

Electric quadrupole potential
The symmetric portion of the integrand from the previous section can be resolved by applying integration by parts and the charge continuity equation as was done for electric dipole radiation.

This corresponds to the traceless electric quadrupole moment tensor . Contracting the second index with the normal vector  allows the vector potential to be expressed as

Electric quadrupole fields
The resulting magnetic and electric fields are:

Pure electric quadrupole power
The average power radiated per unit solid angle by an electric quadrupole is

where θ is measured with respect to the magnetic dipole . The total power radiated is:

Generalized multipole radiation
As the multipole moment of a source distribution increases, the direct calculations employed so far become too cumbersome to continue. Analysis of higher moments requires more general theoretical machinery. Just as before, a single source frequency  is considered. Hence the charge, current, and intrinsic magnetization densities are given by

respectively. The resulting electric and magnetic fields share the same time-dependence as the sources.

Using these definitions and the continuity equation allows Maxwell's equations to be written as

These equations can be combined by taking the curl of the last equations and applying the identity . This gives the vector forms of the non-homogeneous Helmholtz equation.

Solutions of the wave equation
The homogeneous wave equations that describes electromagnetic radiation with frequency  in a source-free region have the form.

The wave function  can be expressed as a sum of vector spherical harmonics

See spherical Bessel functions. The differential operator  is the angular momentum operator with the property . The coefficients  and  correspond to expanding and contracting waves respectively. So  for radiation. To determine the other coefficients, the Green's function for the wave equation is applied. If the source equation is

then the solution is:

The Green function can be expressed in vector spherical harmonics.

Note that  is a differential operator that acts on the source function . Thus, the solution to the wave equation is:

Electric multipole fields
Applying the above solution to the electric multipole wave equation

gives the solution for the magnetic field:

The electric field is:

The formula can be simplified by applying the identities

to the integrand, which results in

Green's theorem and integration by parts manipulates the formula into

The spherical bessel function  can also be simplified by assuming that the radiation length scale is much larger than the source length scale, which is true for most antennas.

Retaining only the lowest order terms results in the simplified form for the electric multipole coefficients:

 is the same as the electric multipole moment in the static case if it were applied to the static charge distribution  whereas  corresponds to an induced electric multipole moment from the intrinsic magnetization of the source material.

Magnetic multipole fields
Applying the above solution to the magnetic multipole wave equation

gives the solution for the electric field:

The magnetic field is:

As before, the forumula simplifies to:

Retaining only the lowest order terms results in the simplified form for the magnetic multipole coefficients:

 is the magnetic multipole moment from the effective magnetization  while  corresponds to the intrinsic magnetization .

General solution
The electric and magnetic multipole fields combine to give the total fields:  

Note that the radial function  can be simplified in the far field limit .

Thus the radial dependence of radiation is recovered.

See also
 Multipole expansion
 Spherical harmonics
 Vector spherical harmonics
 Near and far field
 Quadrupole formula

References 

Electromagnetic radiation